The United People's Party is a political party in Sint Maarten founded in 2010. The party currently holds five seats in the Parliament of Sint Maarten.

UP Next
In 2014, the youth arm of the United People’s Party, “UP Next”, was launched at the Hard Rock Café in Phillipsburg, Sint Maarten.

References

See also
 Claude Wathey

Political parties in Sint Maarten
Political parties established in 2010
2010 establishments in Sint Maarten
United People's Party (Sint Maarten) politicians